Jay Peak Resort is an American ski resort located on Jay Peak in the Green Mountains, between the Village of Jay and Montgomery Center, Vermont. Although mostly located in the town of Jay, Vermont, part of the resort, including the summit of Jay Peak, the Jet Triple Chair area and much of the Big Jay backcountry descent, is located in the town of Westfield, Vermont. The resort is just 4 miles (6.5 km) south of the Canada–United States border, above which is the Province of Quebec.

The resort opened for skiing in 1957, and it now includes year-round activities. The mountain offers 81 trails served by nine lifts. It receives the most snowfall of any ski area in the Northeastern U.S. and is known for its gladed skiing.

In 2008, Jay Peak Resort was purchased by a group of investors headed by Ariel Quiros and the resort's CEO, Bill Stenger. They raised money from EB5 investors and undertook a major expansion of the resort's facilities, adding, among other things, new hotels, condos, an ice rink and a water park. On April 14, 2016, Jay Peak and another Vermont mountain, Burke Mountain Ski Area, were seized by U.S. government officials amid investigations regarding fraudulent offerings of securities. Quiros and Stenger pleaded guilty and received prison sentences.

The resort was operated under US government receivership for more than six years, and in 2022 it was sold,on behalf of the defrauded EB5 investors, to Pacific Group Resorts, Inc.

History

The ski trails were carved into the mountain during the 1950s primarily by its first ski school director/general manager, Walter Foeger, an Austrian and former racer who had previously trained the Spanish Olympic ski team. He arrived in 1956. He developed a method of teaching parallel skiing that avoided first having to teach the student snowplow/stem turns. Instead, students were taught to change direction by means of a slight hop keeping the tips of the skis on the snow, and displacing the back of the skis sideways. He called his ski teaching method "Natur Teknik" (natural technique). The Jay Peak ski school offered a "learn to ski in a week" guarantee. The method was adopted by a number of other ski areas.

In 1955, the resort's first ski lift, a T-bar, was purchased. In January 1957, the resort opened for skiing. In 1968 Weyerhaeuser invested $300,000 in the predecessor organization, Jay Peak, Inc., and loaned it $2.2 million. A 48-room hotel was built in the mid-1970s. In 1978 Mont Saint-Sauveur International, a Canadian firm, bought the resort.

In 2006, the resort employed 550 people in the winter, 100 in the summer. The following year, the resort agreed to pay the State of Vermont $105,000 for violating stormwater rules in polluting a stream while building a new golf course. Despite a drop in skier visits statewide during the 2006–2007 season, Jay Peak saw a record year with skier visits up 7%. In 2007–2008, the resort reported a record 320,000 skiers for the winter. In 2008, it was the second biggest employer in the area. In 2008, the resort was valued by the town of Jay at slightly over $12 million.

EB-5 fraud; water park, ice arena, hotel and other improvements 
By 2008, the resort's owner, Mount Saint-Sauveur, began an EB-5 visa program to finance development. That year, a group headed by Miami businessman Ariel Quiros and the resort's CEO, Bill Stenger, purchased the resort. Before the purchase of Jay, Quiros claimed that he needed to verify the existence of the $18 million already raised by Mount Saint-Sauveur through the EB-5 program. He persuaded the sellers to put the funds into an account at Raymond James Financial, which employed his son-in-law, who helped to retitle the accounts in Quiros' name immediately before the closing of the sale of Jay. They transferred the funds to other accounts, misusing the EB-5 funds to pay part of the purchase price; they used more EB-5 funds raised later to complete the payments owed to Mount Saint-Sauveur.

The new resort company's plan was to invest $100 million in capital improvements for the resort over the next few years. The resort company raised $250 million by 2010, for improvements at Jay and other nearby projects and purchases, including Burke Mountain Ski Area from 250 investors from 43 companies through the incentive of the federal EB-5 visa. Under this visa, every $500,000 invested in the U.S. that results in ten new jobs gains the investor permanent residence. A three-way swap was made with the State of Vermont in 2010. The State deeded  to the resort; the resort relinquished its lease to a  parcel of nearby undeveloped forest back to the state; and the resort sold  to the Green Mountain Club to ensure that the nearby  of Long Trail would have a permanent buffer from ski-area development.

In 2010, $13 million worth of improvements at Jay were completed including an indoor ice arena, a parking garage, an enclosed beginners surface lift, and a new RFID ticketing system. The old Hotel Jay was razed and replaced with a new 170-room hotel. The new facilities also include a spa, conference center, movie theatre and  water park. Also in 2010, Yankee magazine named Jay as the best ski resort in New England. This was the same event for which the resort paid a fine to the state in 2007. By 2012, the resort had repeatedly postponed plans to expand its skiing terrain to a new area to be known as the West Bowl; it is not clear whether the resort has the support of the state to conduct the necessary cutting and construction in the forest.

By 2014, some investors had complained to the Vermont Department of Financial Regulation (DFR) and the U.S. Securities and Exchange Commission (SEC) that the resort company had abruptly reclassified their investments. The investigators found the resort company's answers to their questions about the use of the funds to be evasive. They eventually found that Quiros had diverted millions of the dollars raised for his personal use and that Stenger had lied to investors and the SEC about, among other things, the status of some of the construction projects, some of which were never built, including a biotechnology plant in Newport, Vermont.

On April 14, 2016, Jay Peak and Burke Mountain were seized by U.S. government officials. The resort's liquidity issues were resolved, and the resort remains operational under management of the SEC-designated receiver, Michael Goldberg, and acting CEO Steve Wright, who was formerly Jay Peak's marketing director. On January 15, 2019,Goldberg announced that the resort has been offered for sale. The SEC recovered $81 million from Quiros (including the ski area assets), who pleaded guilty in 2020 to federal crimes including wire fraud, money laundering and obstructing investigators. He was sentenced to five years in prison. Stenger cooperated with the investigation and pleaded guilty in 2021 to supplying false statements to federal investigators. He was sentenced to 18 months in prison and three years of supervisory release, and he was fined $250,000. a third conspirator, William Kelly, also received fines and a prison sentence. Raymond James Financial paid a $150 million settlement for its part in the fraud. In 2022, Goldberg stated that he intended to continue trying to get the EB5 investors' green cards approved.

2022; sale to Pacific Group Resorts
As of 2022, Jay Peak employed more than 1,200 people in the winter and about half that number year-round; profits increased, during the receivership, from $2 million to $10 million annually.

In September 2022, after operating the resort for more than six years, Goldberg conducted an auction of the resort in which the winner was Pacific Group Resorts, Inc. of Park City, Utah, with a bid of $76 million. The sale was approved by the federal court, and approximately $70 million of the purchase funds are to be distributed to the defrauded EB-5 investors, representing about 40% of their original investments. The transaction was completed in November 2022. Pacific stated that it has no plans to make "major changes" to winter operations at the resort.

Trails and lifts

Jay Peak is home to the "Face Chutes," arguably the most challenging and steepest marked terrain in the east with an average slope of 56.5 percent (almost 30°) and a maximum slope of 73.9 percent (37°). The "Face Chutes" consist of four skiable lines, the most challenging being the 3 lines to skier's right, all of which are extremely narrow and include a mandatory cliff drop. The ski area is known for its gladed skiing.

Jay Peak has 9 operating lifts, including two magic carpet surface lifts.

The mountain has a total uphill capacity of approximately 12,820 skiers/hour. The oldest of the lifts, the 60-person aerial tramway, also known as the "tram", is the only one of its type in the State of Vermont. This tramway was originally installed in 1966 by Von Roll, and upgraded in 2000 with new cabins from Garaventa.

In 1985, the resort purchased the Jet Triple chair from Doppelmayr to replace a T-Bar. This was followed in 1987 with the purchase of the Bonaventure Quad which replaced a double chairlift. In 1999 the resort removed the Green Mountain Double chair, which had serviced the north side of the mountain for 30 years, and replaced it with the Green Mountain Flyer (dubbed the "Green Mountain Freezer" by skiers because of its notoriously cold ride due to the strong winds blowing on it), the mountain's first high-speed detachable chairlift. The other five lifts serve the lower mountain terrain.

In May 2016 the state raised concerns over the safety of the aerial tramway, which resulted in $4.5 million worth of electronic upgrades and carriage overhauls. The capacity of the two tram cars was reduced from 60 to 45 at this time.

To gain access to the lifts, an RFID system scans a chip embedded in a plastic card which is typically held in the skier's pocket.

Snowfall
The summit is at an elevation of 3,968 feet (1,209 m), with a 2,153 foot (656 m) vertical drop. Jay Peak has the largest average annual snowfall (359 inches or 9.1 metres) of any ski area in Eastern North America.

Other facilities
The resort has two base lodges and a small lodge at the summit where the aerial tram terminates. There are also hotel facilities and a large number of ski-in/ski-out condominium units on the lower part of the mountain.

Features at Jay include a league-sized hockey rink, the Ice Haus, with room for 700 spectators. Next to it is a 220 space parking garage, where 80% of the slots are covered. In 2011, an indoor water park named The Pump House opened. It features the longest "lazy river" in Vermont. The resort also has a cross-country ski center, a recreation center with climbing walls and a movie theatre, athletic fields, and an 18-hole golf course.

Footnotes

External links 
 
 2022 Ski Magazine article about the securities fraud

Buildings and structures in Orleans County, Vermont
Hotels established in 1957
Jay, Vermont
Ski areas and resorts in Vermont
Tourist attractions in Orleans County, Vermont